This is a list of characters from the manga series Kōtarō Makaritōru!.

Main characters
 - A high school aged karate expert who is descended from a long line of ninja. While he is a fighting genius, he lacks common sense and any inhibitions. He spends most of his time getting into trouble with school officials, and trying to steal girls' underwear; especially Mayumi's. He is very protective of three things: his long hair, his underwear collection, and Mayumi.
 - Captain of the 7th Discipline Squad, Mayumi is Kōtarō's childhood friend and chief romantic interest. She's the only one who seems to be able to keep Koutarou in check. While she is nowhere near Kōtarō's level of strength, she is not a damsel in distress, as she has got a good grip on the basics of both karate and judo. Mayumi also happens to be a member of the school's Decency League, much to Kōtarō's annoyance.
 - A bald samurai who patrols the school as the enforcer of the Decency League. He initially appears to be an enemy of Kōtarō, but as the series progresses he gradually becomes his main rival and best friend. He comes from a traditional upper-class family and has an iinazuke (fiancée chosen by his parents) named Sayoko. He is highly sensitive about mockery of his baldness, and maintains that his head is actually shaved. He is the only character in the series whose fighting ability is equivalent to Kōtarō's, though they have never fought on genuinely even terms, and it is implied that both of them are reluctant to do so, in case it jeopardises their friendship.

Recurring characters
 - The current head Sensei of the Shindō Karate Dojo. He is an extreme pervert that can perform many different tricks with his penis.  He is one of the few people that has defeated Kōtarō. Kyōshirō takes care of Kōtarō as if Kōtarō was his own brother, and possibly that Kōtarō looks him up the same. Kyōshirō is currently in love with Tenzen Shikato's granddaughter, Yurie.
 - A kung-fu expert and master of the nine-section staff. While he is very strong (possibly Kotaro's equal), he has a weakness around women (high-pressure nosebleeds). He develops somewhat of a crush on Mayumi after saving her from punks.
 - The vice head of the cheerleader squad who serve with an extreme loyalty to his leader, stand on almost the same level as Kenji and Tenkōji and one of the few who has fought one-on-one with kotaro.
 - The old man who is the head of the Cheerleader Squad and the oldest (and at the size of a large cat, the smallest) student in the School, Tenzen is one of the top martial artist in the world, and the strongest character in the series, far stronger than even Kōtarō and Tenkoji.  He is Kōtarō's sensei during the National Tournament, but dismissed him after he saw a better successor of his fighting technique. When Yurie, his granddaughter, asked why he no longer wants to train Kōtarō, Tenzen replied that Kōtarō will be the one to surpass him one day. Tenzen is also a pervert that perhaps surpasses even Kotaro.  But even if he's distracted by some perverted acts, he still could make rational decisions.   Tenzen is also one of the richest men in Japan, owning from a TV station to a giant mansion with 1,000 bunny-ear wearing girls.  He is also the founder of the infamous Snakebone Syndicate/Jakotsukai.

Jakotsukai Arc
 - The student body president who will stop at nothing to see Kōtarō defeated and humiliated. He initially offers one million yen to the person who could cut Kōtarō's long hair.
 and  - The duo that frequently appears with Tenkōji. They are mainly there for comic relief.
 - The leader of the powerful Judo Club and an enforcer of the Jakotsukai (Snake Bones Gang). He is sent by Beni Bara to test Kotaro's strength.
Beni Bara - The leader of the Jakotsukai and an extremely skilled fighter. She generally operates from behind the scenes, preferring others to do her dirty work for her. She hides a great number of secrets, including one that Kōtarō manages to discover to his own horror.
 - Captain of the First Discipline Squad. He is a sadist who likes wearing paramilitary uniforms and hitting people with his whip. His twin brother gouged out his eye when he was younger, and he now hides a spring-loaded gag eyeball in its place. He is contracted by Tarako along with Tenkōji to defeat Kōtarō through whatever means possible.

Princess Clara's Visit

 Princess Clara
 Anthony (The giant)
 Chris (The fake bodyguard)
 King Renaldo
 Fred (Prime Minister)

War in D Block
Tatsuya Yoshioka - The newly appointed leader of the Decency League. Despite his bishounen looks and genius IQ, he's a capable fighter. Tatsuya is the one who sends Kotaro into D Block to locate the Legacy of the Jakotsukai. He seems to have some hidden agenda.
 - Tatsuya's younger sister who is first seen running from punks in D Block. She decides to help Kotaro on his mission in D Block. She's rather headstrong, but a pretty good fighter as well.
 - A worthless thug who attempts to pass himself off as Kōtarō to rule D Block. After it backfires, he decides to become Kotaro's underling instead. His real name is never mentioned, and Kōtarō simply calls him 'Nisemono'(lit. Impersonator).
Take the Hedgehog - The former leader of the Punks, the strongest gang in D Block. After losing to the Cyclops gang, he is whipped and strung up as a warning to others. When Kotaro rescues him from starvation, he decides to become his underling as well.
 - The ruthless leader of the Cyclops gang and Shunpei Sadoya's twin brother. Where Shunpei's left eye is missing, Ryūhei has a severely disfigured right eye. He is far more skilled than his brother; using two whips simultaneously with far greater effect. He is incredibly sadistic and is prone to vomiting when hearing people talk about things like love and friendship. His goal in D Block is to obtain the Legacy of the Jakotsukai and unite the gangs of Japan under his authority.
 - The leader of the China Rose Gang and Kenji's elder brother. A pretty transvestite like the rest of the China Rose gang.

School Tournament

References

Kotaro Makaritoru